My Beloved Juan (Spanish:Mi adorado Juan) is a 1950 Spanish comedy film directed by Jerónimo Mihura and starring Conchita Montes, Conrado San Martín and Juan de Landa.

Synopsis 
The strange disappearance of the dogs of his neighbors leads Juan to investigate it, falling all suspicion on a certain Eloísa, the proud daughter of a scientist who uses dogs to create an antidote against sleep. Juan is a person who is everyone's friend because his only occupation is to do favors for everyone and sleep a lot, with the conviction that whoever sleeps well has to be a good person, without the evil and rancor that comes from not sleeping. In this way he establishes acquaintance with Eloisa.

Cast
 Conchita Montes as Eloísa Palacios  
 Conrado San Martín as Juan  
 Juan de Landa as Sebastián  
 Luis Pérez de León as Doctor Vidal  
 Alberto Romea as Doctor Palacios  
 José Isbert as Pedro  
 Rafael Navarro as Doctor Manríquez  
 Julia Lajos as Rosa  
 Rosita Valero as Camarera 
 Leandro Alpuente as Antonio  
 Modesto Cid as Criado  
 José Ramón Giner as Paulino  
 Eugenio Testa as Director

References

Bibliography
 Labanyi, Jo & Pavlović, Tatjana. A Companion to Spanish Cinema. John Wiley & Sons, 2012.

External links 

1950 films
1950 comedy films
Spanish comedy films
1950s Spanish-language films
Films directed by Jerónimo Mihura
Spanish black-and-white films
1950s Spanish films